Pope Boniface VIII (r. 1294–1303) created 15 new cardinals in five consistories:

Consistory at the beginning of 1295
 Benedetto Caetani, nephew of the Pope – cardinal-deacon of SS. Cosma e Damiano, † 14 December 1296

Consistory of 17 December 1295
 Giacomo Tomassi-Caetani, O.F.M., nephew of the Pope – cardinal-priest of S. Clemente, † 1 January 1300
 Francesco Napoleone Orsini – cardinal-deacon of S. Lucia in Orthea. † 1312.
 Giacomo Gaetani Stefaneschi – cardinal-deacon of S. Giorgio in Velabro, † 23 June 1341
 Francesco Caetani, nephew of the Pope – cardinal-deacon of S. Maria in Cosmedin, † 16 May 1317
 Pietro Valeriano Duraguerra, vicechancellor of the Holy Roman Church – cardinal-deacon of S. Maria Nuova, † 17 December 1302.

Consistory of 4 December 1298
 Gonzalo Pérez Gudiel, archbishop of Toledo – cardinal-bishop of Albano, † in December 1299.
 Teodorico Ranieri, elect of Pisa, camerlengo of the Holy Roman Church – cardinal-priest of S. Croce in Gerusalemme, then (13 June 1299) cardinal-bishop of Città Papale, † 7 December 1306.
 Niccolò Boccasini, O.P., master general of the Order of Preachers – cardinal-priest of S. Sabina (received the title on 25 March 1299), then cardinal-bishop of Ostia e Velletri (2 March 1300); became Pope Benedict XI on 22 October 1303, † 7 July 1304
 Riccardo Petroni, vicechancellor of the Holy Roman Church – cardinal-deacon of S. Eustachio, † 10 February 1314.

Consistory of 2 March 1300
 Leonardo Patrasso, relative of the Pope, archbishop of Capua – cardinal-bishop of Albano, † 7 December 1311.
 Gentile Partino, O.F.M. – cardinal-priest of SS. Silvestro e Martino, † 27 October 1312.
 Luca Fieschi – cardinal-deacon of S. Maria in Via Lata, † 31 January 1336.

Consistory of 15 December 1302
 Pedro Ispano, bishop of Burgos – cardinal-bishop of Sabina, † 20 December 1310.
 Giovanni Mincio da Morrovalle, O.F.M., master general of the Order of Friars Minor – cardinal-bishop of Porto e S. Rufina, † in August 1312

Sources

Konrad Eubel, Hierarchia Catholica, vol. I, 1913

Boniface VIII
College of Cardinals
 Bonif
 Bon